Kathleen Kemarre Wallace (born 1 July 1948), is an Eastern Arrernte artist, author, custodian and cultural leader from Ltyentye Apurte in the Northern Territory of Australia.

Early life 
Wallace was born near Ltyentye Apurte, a remote area of Central Australia. She is senior Eastern Arrernte speaker. Her family kept her away from stations and missions to prevent her removal under the Aboriginals Ordinance 1918 Act. When she was 13, her family was forced to move to Santa Teresa Mission, now Ltyentye Apurte Community. This move was caused by severe drought and the interruption of traditional hunting and food gathering by encroaching station activities.

Career 
Wallace has lived on her homelands her whole life and she has always viewed it as her responsibility to ensure traditional knowledge is handed on; especially through art and storytelling.

In 1989 she was a founding member of Keringke Arts and, since then, has become one of their most successful artists and her work is represented in many national and international collections.

Her artworks are very influenced by her Catholic faith and she says:

Wallace has published two books Plants of the Santa Teresa region of Central Australia and Listen deeply: let these stories in. 

In October 2019 the stained glass window that Wallace designed was installed at the Our Lady of Sacred Heart Catholic Church in Alice Springs which is celebrated for showing the blending of Catholic and Indigenous beliefs. The title of the painting, which became the stained glass is Urtakwerte Atywerrenge Anthurre or, in English, Very Sacred Heart and it depicts the Virgin Mary and Jesus standing on a sandhill and different parts of the painting representing different aspects of her blended faith. She also was a senior advisor on the Indigemoji app launched in 2019. This app provides 90 emojis representing central Australia's Indigenous Arrernte culture and is Australia’s first set of Indigenous emojis.

In addition to being an artist Wallace has worked as a teacher and served her community as an elected councillor for Ltyentye Apurte as well as being a member of the executive committee of Desart.

Wallace and her husband Douglas had no children of their own but they have raised more than 30 children throughout their marriage; taking in children when they were neglected or their parents were drinking. This earned her the nickname "Mum".

Selected works 
 Wallace Kathleen Kemarre with Davis, Jane (1986), Plants of the Santa Teresa region of Central Australia
 Wallace Kathleen Kemarre with Lovell, Judy (2009), Listen deeply: let these stories in, IAD Press, 
Indigemoji (2019) App and website

Awards 

 2001 Finalist, National Aboriginal and Torres Strait Islander Art Award
 2010 Shortlist, Territory Read Awards for Listen deeply: let these stories in
 2020 Honoree, Public Service & Activism, Webby Award for Indigemoji
 2020 Honorary Mention, Digital Communities, Prix Ars Electronica for Indigemoji
 2020 Best Digital Product, First Nations Media Awards for Indigemoji

References 

1943 births
Living people
20th-century Australian women artists
20th-century Australian artists
21st-century Australian women artists
21st-century Australian artists
Australian Aboriginal artists
Arrernte people
Australian Roman Catholics